Paul van der Gucht (2 November 1911 – 15 December 1993) was an English cricketer. He played for Gloucestershire between 1932 and 1933, and later had a long first-class career in India, representing the Europeans in the Bombay Quadrangular from 1935 to 1936 and Bengal in the Ranji Trophy from 1937 to 1947.

References

External links

1911 births
1993 deaths
English cricketers
Gloucestershire cricketers
Europeans cricketers
Bengal cricketers
Marylebone Cricket Club cricketers
Sportspeople from Worksop
Cricketers from Nottinghamshire
People educated at Radley College
Wicket-keepers